Kobe (officially) is the capital city of Hyōgo Prefecture Japan. With a population around 1.5 million, Kobe is Japan's seventh-largest city and the third-largest port city after Tokyo and Yokohama. It is located in Kansai region, which makes up the southern side of the main island of Honshū, on the north shore of Osaka Bay. It is part of the Keihanshin metropolitan area along with Osaka and Kyoto.

The earliest written records regarding the region come from the Nihon Shoki, which describes the founding of the Ikuta Shrine by Empress Jingū in AD 201. For most of its history, the area was never a single political entity, even during the Tokugawa period, when the port was controlled directly by the Tokugawa shogunate. Kobe did not exist in its current form until its founding in 1889. Kobe became one of Japan's designated cities in 1956. 

Kobe was one of the cities to open for trade with the West following the 1853 end of the policy of seclusion and has since been known as a cosmopolitan and nuclear-free zone port city. While the 1995 Great Hanshin earthquake diminished much of Kobe's prominence as a port city, it remains Japan's fourth-busiest container port.  Companies headquartered in Kobe include ASICS, Kawasaki Heavy Industries, and Kobe Steel, as well as over 100 international corporations with Asian or Japanese headquarters in the city, such as Eli Lilly and Company, Procter & Gamble, Boehringer Ingelheim, and Nestlé. The city is the point of origin and namesake of Kobe beef, the home of Kobe University, as well as the site of one of Japan's most famous hot spring resorts, Arima Onsen.

History

Origins
Tools found in western Kobe demonstrate the area was populated at least from the Jōmon period.

The natural geography of the area, particularly of Wada Cape in Hyōgo-ku, led to the development of a port, which would remain the economic center of the city. Some of the earliest written documents mentioning the region include the Nihon Shoki, which describes the founding of the Ikuta Shrine by Empress Jingū in AD 201.

Nara and Heian periods
During the Nara and Heian periods, the port was known by the name  and was one of the ports from which imperial embassies to China were dispatched. 
The city was briefly the capital of Japan in 1180, when Taira no Kiyomori moved his grandson Emperor Antoku to Fukuhara-kyō in present-day Hyōgo-ku. The Emperor returned to Kyoto after about five months.
Shortly thereafter in 1184, the Taira fortress in Hyōgo-ku and the nearby Ikuta Shrine became the sites of the Genpei War battle of Ichi-no-Tani between the Taira and Minamoto clans. The Minamoto prevailed, pushing the Taira further.

Kamakura period
As the port grew during the Kamakura period, it became an important hub for trade with China and other countries. In the 13th century, the city came to be known by the name . During this time, Hyōgo Port, along with northern Osaka, composed the province of Settsu (most of today's Kobe belonged to Settsu except Nishi Ward and Tarumi Ward, which belonged to Harima).

Edo period
Later, during the Edo period, the eastern parts of present-day Kobe came under the jurisdiction of the Amagasaki Domain and the western parts under that of the Akashi Domain, while the center was controlled directly by the Tokugawa shogunate.
It was not until the abolition of the han system in 1871 and the establishment of the current prefecture system that the area became politically distinct.

Meiji period
Hyōgo Port was opened to foreign trade by the Shogunal government at the same time as Osaka on January 1, 1868, just before the advent of the Boshin War and the Meiji Restoration. At the time of the opening of the city for foreign trade, the area saw intense fighting resulting from the civil war in progress. Shortly after the opening of Kobe to trade, the Kobe Incident occurred, where several western soldiers sustained gunshot wounds from fire opened by troops from Bizen. The region has since been identified with the West and many foreign residences from the period remain in Kobe's Kitano area.

Modern era 
Kobe, as it is known today, was founded on April 1, 1889, and was designated on September 1, 1956 by government ordinance.

During World War II, Kobe was bombed in the Doolittle Raid on April 18, 1942, along with Tokyo and a few other cities. Eventually, it was bombed again with incendiary bombs by B-29 bombers on March 17, 1945, causing the death of 8,841 residents and destroying 21% of Kobe's urban area. This incident inspired the well-known Studio Ghibli film Grave of the Fireflies and the book by Akiyuki Nosaka on which the film was based. It also features in the motion picture A Boy Called H.

Following continuous pressure from citizens, on March 18, 1975, the Kobe City Council passed an ordinance banning vessels carrying nuclear weapons from Kobe Port. This effectively prevented any U.S. warships from entering the port, policy being not to disclose whether any warship is carrying nuclear weapons. This nonproliferation policy has been termed the "Kobe formula".

On January 17, 1995, a magnitude 6.9 earthquake occurred at 5:46 am JST near the city. About 6,434 people in the city were killed, 212,443 were made homeless, and large parts of the port facilities and other parts of the city were destroyed. The earthquake destroyed portions of the Hanshin Expressway, an elevated freeway that dramatically toppled over. In Japan, the earthquake is known as the Great Hanshin earthquake (or the Hanshin-Awaji earthquake). To commemorate Kobe's recovery from the 1995 quake, the city holds an event every December called the Luminarie, where the city center is decorated with illuminated metal archways.

The Port of Kobe was Japan's busiest port and one of Asia's top ports until the Great Hanshin earthquake. Kobe has since dropped to fourth in Japan and 49th-busiest container port worldwide.

Geography 

Wedged between the coast and the mountains, the city of Kobe is long and narrow. To the east is the city of Ashiya, while the city of Akashi lies to its west. Other adjacent cities include Takarazuka and Nishinomiya to the east and Sanda and Miki to the north.

The landmark of the port area is the red steel Port Tower. A ferris wheel sits in nearby Harborland, a notable tourist promenade. Two artificial islands, Port Island and Rokkō Island, have been constructed to give the city room to expand.

Away from the seaside at the heart of Kobe lie the Motomachi and Sannomiya districts, as well as Kobe's Chinatown, Nankin-machi, all well-known retail areas. A multitude of train lines cross the city from east to west. The main transport hub is Sannomiya Station, with the eponymous Kobe Station located to the west and the Shinkansen Shin-Kobe Station to the north.

During the autumn season, it is famous for the rich change in colors of its forests.

Wards 
Kobe has nine wards (ku):

 Nishi-ku: The westernmost area of Kobe, Nishi-ku overlooks the city of Akashi and is the site of Kobe Gakuin University. This ward has the largest population, with 247,000 residents.
 Kita-ku: Kita-ku is the largest ward by area and contains the Rokko Mountain Range, including Mount Rokkō and Mount Maya. The area is well known for its rugged landscape and hiking trails. The onsen resort town of Arima also lies within Kita-ku.
 Tarumi-ku: Tarumi-ku is a mostly residential area. The longest suspension bridge in the world, the Akashi Kaikyō Bridge, extends from Maiko in Tarumi-ku to Awaji Island to the south. A relatively new addition to Kobe, Tarumi-ku was not a part of the city until 1946.
 Suma-ku: Suma-ku is the site of Suma beach, attracting visitors during the summer months.
 Nagata-ku: Nagata-ku is the site of Nagata Shrine, one of the three "Great Shrines" in Kobe.
 Hyōgo-ku: At various times known as Ōwada Anchorage or Hyōgo Port, this area is the historical heart of the city. Shinkaichi in Hyogo-ku was once the commercial center of Kobe, but was heavily damaged during World War II, and since, Hyogo-ku has lost much of its former prominence.
 Chūō-ku:  literally means "central" and, as such, Chūō-ku is the commercial and entertainment center of Kobe. Sannomiya, Motomachi and Harborland make up the main entertainment areas in Kobe. Chūō-ku includes the city hall and Hyōgo prefectural government offices. Port Island and Kobe Airport lie in the southern part of this ward.
 Nada-ku: The site of Oji Zoo and Kobe University, Nada is known for its sake. Along with Fushimi in Kyoto, it accounts for 45% of Japan's sake production.
 Higashinada-ku: The easternmost area of Kobe, Higashinada-ku borders the city of Ashiya. The man-made island of Rokko makes up the southern part of this ward.

Cityscape

Climate
Kobe has a humid subtropical climate (Köppen climate classification Cfa) with hot summers and cool to cold winters. Precipitation is significantly higher in summer than in winter, though on the whole lower than most parts of Honshū, and there is no significant snowfall.

Demographics

As of September 2007, Kobe had an estimated population of 1,530,295 making up 658,876 households. This was an increase of 1,347 persons or approximately 0.1% over the previous year. The population density was approximately 2,768 persons per square kilometre, while there are about 90.2 males to every 100 females.  About thirteen percent of the population are between the ages of 0 and 14, sixty-seven percent are between 15 and 64, and twenty percent are over the age of 65.

Approximately 44,000 registered foreign nationals live in Kobe. The four most common nationalities are Korean (22,237), Chinese (12,516), Vietnamese (1,301), and American (1,280).

Economy

The Port of Kobe is both an important port and manufacturing center within the Hanshin Industrial Region. Kobe is the busiest container port in the region, surpassing even Osaka, and the fourth-busiest in Japan.

, the city's total real GDP was ¥6.3 trillion, which amounts to thirty-four percent of the GDP for Hyōgo Prefecture and approximately eight percent for the whole Kansai region. Per capita income for the year was approximately ¥2.7 million.  Broken down by sector, about one percent of those employed work in the primary sector (agriculture, fishing and mining), twenty-one percent work in the secondary sector (manufacturing and industry), and seventy-eight percent work in the service sector.

The value of manufactured goods produced and exported from Kobe for 2004 was ¥2.5 trillion. The four largest sectors in terms of value of goods produced are small appliances, food products, transportation equipment, and communication equipment making up over fifty percent of Kobe's manufactured goods. In terms of numbers of employees, food products, small appliances, and transportation equipment make up the three largest sectors.

The GDP in Kobe Metropolitan Employment Area (2.4 million people) is US$96.0 billion in 2010.

Major companies and institutes 
Japanese companies which have their headquarters in Kobe include ASICS, a shoe manufacturer; Daiei, a department store chain; Kawasaki Heavy Industries, Kawasaki Shipbuilding Co., Mitsubishi Motors, Mitsubishi Heavy Industries (ship manufacturer), Mitsubishi Electric, Kobe Steel, Sumitomo Rubber Industries, Sysmex Corporation (medical devices manufacturer) and TOA Corporation. Other companies include the confectionery manufacturers Konigs-Krone and Morozoff Ltd., Sun Television Japan and UCC Ueshima Coffee Co.

There are over 100 international corporations that have their East Asian or Japanese headquarters in Kobe. Of these, twenty-four are from China, eighteen from the United States, and nine from Switzerland. Some prominent corporations include Eli Lilly and Company, Nestlé, Procter & Gamble, Tempur-Pedic, Boehringer-Ingelheim, and Toys "R" Us. In 2018, April, Swift Engineering USA, an American aerospace engineering firm established their joint venture in Kobe called Swift Xi Inc.

Kobe is the site of a number of research institutes, such as the RIKEN Kobe Institute Center for developmental biology and medical imaging techniques, and Advanced Institute for Computational Science (AICS, home of the K supercomputer), the National Institute of Information and Communications Technology (NICT) Advanced ICT Research Institute, the National Research Institute for Earth Science and Disaster Prevention, and the Asian Disaster Reduction Center.

International organizations include the WHO Centre for Health Development, an intergovernmental agency forming part of the World Health Organization. The Consulate-General of Panama in Kobe is located on the eighth floor of the Moriyama Building in Chūō-ku, Kobe.

Transportation

Airways

Airport
Itami Airport, in nearby Itami, serves mainly domestic flights throughout Japan, Kobe Airport, built on a reclaimed island south of Port Island, also offers mainly domestic flights, while Kansai International Airport in Osaka mainly serves international flights in the area.

Railways

High-speed rail
JR west
Sanyō Shinkansen：- Shin-Kobe Station -

Rapid Railway
Sannomiya Station is the main commuter hub in Kobe, serving as the transfer point for the three major intercity rail lines (see external map). 
The JR Kobe Line connects Kobe to Osaka and Himeji while both the Hankyū Kobe Line and the Hanshin Main Line run from Kobe to Umeda Station in Osaka.

Sanyō Electric Railway trains from Himeji reach Sannomiya via the Kobe Rapid Railway.

Subway
In addition, Kobe Municipal Subway provides access to the Sanyō Shinkansen at Shin-Kobe Station.

Other rail lines
Other rail lines in Kobe include Kōbe Electric Railway which runs north to Sanda and Arima Onsen. Hokushin Kyūkō Railway connects Shin-Kobe Station to Tanigami Station on the Kobe Electric Railway. Kobe New Transit runs two lines, the Port Island Line from Sannomiya to Kobe Airport and the Rokko Island Line from JR Sumiyoshi Station to Rokko Island.

Ropeway
Over Mount Rokkō, the city has two funicular lines and three aerial lifts as well, namely Maya Cablecar, Rokkō Cable Line, Rokkō Arima Ropeway, Maya Ropeway, and Shin-Kobe Ropeway.

Road
Kobe is a transportation hub for a number of expressways, including the Meishin Expressway (Nagoya – Kobe) and the Hanshin Expressway (Osaka – Kobe). Other expressways include the Sanyō Expressway (Kobe – Yamaguchi) and the Chūgoku Expressway (Osaka – Yamaguchi).
The Kobe-Awaji-Naruto Expressway runs from Kobe to Naruto via Awaji Island and includes the Akashi Kaikyō Bridge, the longest suspension bridge in the world.

Port
Sub Area Activity Hanshin is one of the Japan Maritime-Self Defense Force facility which provide monitoring across Osaka Bay and Harima-nada Sea.

Education 

The city of Kobe directly administers 169 elementary and 81 middle schools, with enrollments of approximately 80,200 and 36,000 students, respectively.  If the city's four private elementary schools and fourteen private middle schools are included, these figures jump to a total 82,000 elementary school students and 42,300 junior high students enrolled for the 2006 school year.

Kobe also directly controls six of the city's twenty-five full-time public high schools including Fukiai High School and Rokkō Island High School. The remainder are administered by the Hyogo Prefectural Board of Education.  In addition, twenty-five high schools are run privately within the city.  The total enrollment for high schools in 2006 was 43,400.

Kobe is home to eighteen public and private universities, including Kobe University, Kobe Institute of Computing and Konan University, and eight junior colleges. Students enrolled for 2006 reached 67,000 and 4,100, respectively.   Kobe is also home to 17 Japanese language schools for international students, including the international training group Lexis Japan.

International schools serve both long-term foreign residents and expatriates living in Kobe and the Kansai region. The schools offer instruction in English, German, Chinese, and Korean. There are three English-language international schools: Canadian Academy, Marist Brothers International School, and St. Michael's International School.

Culture 

Kobe is most famous for its Kobe beef (which is raised in the surrounding Hyōgo Prefecture) and Arima Onsen (hot springs). Notable buildings include the Ikuta Shrine as well as the Kobe Port Tower. Nearby mountains such as Mount Rokkō and Mount Maya overlook the city.

The city is widely associated with cosmopolitanism and fashion, encapsulated in the Japanese saying, "If you can't go to Paris, go to Kobe." The biannual fashion event Kobe Fashion Week, featuring the Kobe Collection, is held in Kobe. The jazz festival "Kobe Jazz Street" has been held every October at jazz clubs and hotels since 1981. It also hosts both a Festival, as well as a statue of Elvis Presley, the unveiling of which was heralded by the presence of former Prime Minister of Japan Junichiro Koizumi.

Kobe is the site of Japan's first golf course, Kobe Golf Club, established by Arthur Hesketh Groom in 1903, and Japan's first mosque, Kobe Mosque, built in 1935. The city hosts the Kobe Regatta & Athletic Club, founded in 1870 by Alexander Cameron Sim, and a prominent foreign cemetery. A number of Western-style residences –  – from the 19th century still stand in Kitano and elsewhere in Kobe. Museums include the Kobe City Museum and Museum of Literature.

The dialect spoken in Kobe is called Kobe-ben, a sub-dialect of Kansai dialect.

Sports 

Kobe hosted the 1985 Summer Universiade,the 1991 Men's Asian Basketball Championship, which was the qualifier for the 1992 Summer Olympics Basketball Tournament.
Kobe was one of the host cities of the 2002 FIFA World Cup, hosting matches at Noevir Stadium Kobe (then known as Wing Stadium Kobe), which was renovated to increase its capacity to 40,000 for the event. 
Kobe was one of the host cities for the official 2006 Women's Volleyball World Championship.

Kobe also hosted the World Darts Federation World Cup in October 2017. The event was held in the Exhibition Hall in Port Island with over 50 countries competing.

International relations

Twin towns – sister cities

Kobe's sister cities are:

 Barcelona, Catalonia, Spain (1993)
 Brisbane, Queensland, Australia (1985)
 Incheon, South Korea (2010)
 Genoa, Liguria, Italy (1963)
 Marseille, Provence-Alpes-Côte d'Azur, France (1961)
 Riga, Latvia (1974)
 Rio de Janeiro, Brazil (1969)
 Seattle, WA, United States (1957)
 Tianjin, China (1973)

Friendship and cooperation cities
Kobe also cooperates with:
 Daegu, South Korea (2010)
 Philadelphia, PA, United States (1986)

A memorandum of understanding on the possible establishment of sister city relations in the future was concluded in 2019 with Ahmedabad, Gujarat, India.

Sister ports
Kobe's sister ports are:
 Port of Rotterdam, Netherlands (1967)
 Port of Seattle, United States (1967)
 Port of Tianjin, China

Gallery

References

Bibliography

External links 

 
 Kobe City official website 
 Kobe City official website
 New York Public Library Digital Gallery – late 19th-century photographs of Kobe
 
  
 
 

 
Cities designated by government ordinance of Japan
Cities destroyed by earthquakes
Cities in Hyōgo Prefecture
Populated coastal places in Japan
Port settlements in Japan